New Sandy Bay Village is a village in Charlotte Parish, Saint Vincent and the Grenadines. The village is located on the north shore of the island of Saint Vincent at only 62 feet above sea level.

References

See also
 Charlotte Parish

Populated places in Saint Vincent and the Grenadines